HMS Splendid was a third-batch S-class submarine built for the Royal Navy during World War II. She was laid down on 7 March 1941 and launched on 19 January 1942. After an initial patrol through the Bay of Biscay to Gibraltar, Splendid conducted two patrols in the Mediterranean Sea; one was abandoned after technical problems and on the other she sank two Italian ships. On her next patrol, the submarine attacked two Italian convoys, sinking an Italian destroyer in the second attack. Based in Algiers, the boat operated north of Sicily, sinking six Italian ships, including two tankers and two heavy merchant ships. Splendid was detected by a German destroyer on 21 April 1943 while patrolling off Naples, Italy; the submarine was attacked with depth charges by the destroyer and forced to surface, after which she was scuttled and her surviving crew members taken prisoner. She was the most successful British submarine by tonnage sunk between November 1942 and May 1943.

Design and description

The S-class submarines were designed to patrol the restricted waters of the North Sea and the Mediterranean Sea. The third batch was slightly enlarged and improved over the preceding second batch of the S class. They displaced  on the surface and  submerged. The S-class submarines had a crew of 48 officers and ratings.

For surface running, the boats were powered by two  diesel engines, each driving one propeller shaft. When submerged each propeller was driven by a  electric motor. They could reach  on the surface and  underwater.

The boats were armed with six 21-inch (533 mm) torpedo tubes in the bow, and one external tube mounted in the stern. They carried six reload torpedoes for the bow tubes for a total of thirteen torpedoes. Twelve mines could be carried in lieu of the internally stowed torpedoes. They also had a 3-inch (76 mm) deck gun. It is uncertain if Splendid was completed with a  Oerlikon light AA gun or had one added later. The third-batch S-class boats were fitted with either a Type 129AR or 138 ASDIC system and a Type 291 or 291W early-warning radar.

Construction and career
HMS Splendid was a third-group S-class submarine and was ordered as part of the 1941 Naval Programme on 14 October 1940. She was laid down in the Chatham Dockyard on 7 March 1941 and launched on 19 January 1942. On 8 August 1942, Splendid, under the command of Lieutenant Ian McGeoch, was commissioned into the Royal Navy. Splendid was the third Royal Navy ship with this name.

After a period of training, Splendid departed Holy Loch on 3 October 1942, together with her sister ship, . After ten days at sea, Splendid spotted smoke shortly after midday and gave chase to the unidentified ship; four hours later, she stopped and boarded the vessel, which turned out to be the Allied Gaizka, running behind schedule. Later in the day, the submarine spotted a U-boat, but could not identify it and did not attack. Splendid safely arrived in Gibraltar on 16 October.

Gibraltar
Splendid left Gibraltar on 31 October to patrol off Toulon, France; however, the boat encountered problems with her aft diving planes and had to return to port and abandon the patrol.

The submarine again departed port on 7 November to patrol off Toulon; she was transferred the following week to operate off Naples instead. On 16 November, Splendid fired six torpedoes at a German U-boat, but missed. Later that day, the British submarine surfaced and sank with gunfire the Italian anti-submarine schooner San Paolo northwest of Gorgona, Italy. The next day, the boat attacked the Italian   with her single unreloadable aft torpedo; the plan was to surface once the destroyer was sunk and engage the merchant ships with the deck gun on the surface. The torpedo hit and damaged Velite, but the unexpected presence of two additional destroyers foiled the planned surface attack. While returning from her patrol on 23 November, Splendid encountered the Italian merchant Favorita northwest of Sardinia and sank her with gunfire on the surface, having expended all of her torpedoes. The submarine finally ended her patrol on 28 November.

On 8 December, Splendid started another patrol, north of Tunisia. On 17 December, Splendid sighted another convoy and fired six torpedoes at the heavy German transport Ankara; one torpedo passed  in front of the ship's bow and another  behind the ship's stern. The  was less lucky and was hit twice, going down in ten seconds with 220 dead. The British submarine  observed the attack and confirmed the sinking. Splendid fired her last working torpedo at the Italian submarine , but missed. The boat then ended her patrol in Algiers on Christmas 1942.

Algiers

Splendids next patrol started on 5 January 1943, operating off Sardinia. After patrolling for four days, the boat landed two Special Operations Executive men on Sardinia's eastern coast. The submarine was then ordered to patrol off Naples instead, and set course for her new patrol area. On 15 January, Splendid sighted an Italian convoy and fired five torpedoes at the merchant ship Emma, which was transporting 950 tons of supplies and ten tanks. One torpedo hit, and the merchant ship was stopped dead in the water. However, the ship did not sink, and the submarine stayed close by to attack the ship again in daylight. During the night, the Italian ships attempted to tow Emma, but could not due to rough seas, and the submarine attacked the next morning with one torpedo, which sank the ship. A brief counter-attack with depth charges followed, but Splendid evaded the destroyers and was not damaged. The submarine later sank the Italian minesweeper Cleopatra with gunfire east of Sardinia, then damaged the armed trawler Violette with gunfire, and went on to sink the Italian merchant Commercio with torpedoes on the same day, 19 January. Splendid returned to Algiers on 22 January.

On 13 February, the boat departed Algiers again for another patrol in the same area as before, north of Sicily. Splendid sighted an Italian convoy on 17 February and sank the Italian merchant ship XXI Aprile, which was laden with 300 tons of ammunition, 150 tons of supplies, and 50 motorised vehicles. One week later, the submarine attacked another Italian convoy, expending all her torpedoes, but did not sink any ships. Splendid ended her patrol on 28 February in Algiers.

Splendid commenced another patrol on 11 March, north of Sicily as in previous patrols. After patrolling for five days, the boat sank the heavily escorted Italian tanker Devoli, then sank the tanker Giorgio four days later northeast of Cefalù, Sicily. The submarine ended patrol in Malta on 28 March. Splendids commanding officer, Lieutenant McGeoch, was awarded the Distinguished Service Order following this patrol. Between her first patrol in the Mediterranean in November 1942 and her sinking on 21 April 1943, Splendid was the most successful British submarine in total tonnage sunk between the invasion of French North Africa, codenamed Operation Torch, in November 1942 and the surrender of Axis forces in Tunisia in May 1943.

Sinking

Splendid departed Malta on 18 April 1943 for a patrol off Naples which was her last. Hermes was the largest German ship in the Mediterranean Sea except for auxiliary minesweepers. She was fired upon by the destroyer's surface guns, which killed 18 crew members and wounded the commanding officer. Splendid was scuttled to prevent her capture by enemy forces, and her surviving crew were imprisoned in Italian prisoner-of-war camps. Splendids commander, Ian McGeoch, despite having lost the use of one eye during the submarine's sinking, made two escape attempts, the second of which was successful; he arrived in Switzerland to have a metal splinter removed from his eye, then travelled through France and Spain to England.

Summary of raiding history

References

Citations

Sources

External links 
 IWM Interview with Ian McGeoch, who commanded HMS Splendid from 1942 to 1943

 

British S-class submarines (1931)
World War II shipwrecks in the Mediterranean Sea
1942 ships
World War II submarines of the United Kingdom
Lost submarines of the United Kingdom
Maritime incidents in April 1943
Submarines sunk by German warships